The Haramain High Speed Railway (Haramain referring to Mecca and Medina Islamic holy cities), also known as the Western railway or Mecca–Medina high-speed railway, is a  high-speed rail line in Saudi Arabia. It links the Muslim holy cities of Medina and Mecca via King Abdullah Economic City and Jeddah, using  of main line and a  branch connection to King Abdulaziz International Airport (KAIA), in Jeddah.

Construction on the project began in March 2009, was officially inaugurated on 25 September 2018, and opened to the public on 11 October 2018. 
The railway is expected to carry 60 million passengers a year, including around 3-4 million Hajj and Umrah pilgrims, helping to relieve traffic congestion on the roads. It does not connect with the Mecca Metro.

On March 31, 2021 the first trip to Madinah was launched and the operations between Makkah and Madinah will resume after they were postponed from March 20, 2020 due to the COVID-19 pandemic.

History

Phase I

Package 1
The 6.79 billion riyal (US$1.8 billion) design and construction contract for Phase I Package 1 – Civil Works for the project was awarded in March 2009 to Al Rajhi Alliance, which comprises China Railway Construction Corporation (CRCC), Al Arrab Contracting Company Ltd, Al Suwailem Company and the French construction company Bouygues. It is cooperating with the consultant Saudi Consolidated Engineering Company (Khatib and Alami). Scott Wilson Group will provide project management support.

Package 2
Phase I Package 2 covers construction of four of the five stations. In April 2009, $38 million worth of design contracts for the stations in Mecca, Medina, Jeddah and KAIA were awarded to a joint venture between Foster + Partners and Buro Happold. In February 2011 the station construction contracts were awarded to Joint Venture between Saudi Oger Ltd & El Seif Engineering for (KAEC (Rabigh) & Jeddah Stations), Saudi Binladin (Mecca Station) and a Turkish Company "Yapi Merkezi" for Medina Station.

Phase II
Phase 2 of the project includes the remaining infrastructure not included in Phase-1: track, signalling, telecommunications, power, electrification, etc. It also includes procurement of rolling stock and operations and maintenance for a period of 12 years after completion.

Prequalified consortia for HHR Phase 2 included Saudi Binladin Group, Badr Consortium, China South Locomotive & Rolling Stock, Al-Shoula Group and Al-Rajhi Alliance.

On 26 October 2011, at the Saudi Railways Organization announced that the Saudi-Spanish consortium Al‑Shoula Group, which includes Talgo, Renfe, Adif, Copasa, Imathia, Consultrans, Ineco, Cobra, Indra, Dimetronic, Inabensa, OHL, AL-Shoula and Al-Rosan, had been chosen for the contract. Talgo will supply 35 Talgo 350 trains similar to 102/112 series used on Spanish high-speed lines for EUR 1,257 billion (1,600 with maintenance) and an option for 23 more for 800 million. They differ from the 112 series with 13 cars to 417 seats Renfe and Adif will operate the trains and manage the line for 12 years.

The project was originally planned to open in 2012, taking six years longer to complete than anticipated. The total contract value is EUR 6.736 billion (approximately US$9.4 billion).

Fire

On 29 September 2019, less than a year after the opening of the line, a massive fire broke out at Jeddah station. The roof panels, made of fibre-reinforced plastic, caught fire due to unknown causes. Firefighters needed 12 hours to bring the fire under control. Several people were wounded by the fire, which completely destroyed Jeddah station. To allow train service between Mecca and Medina to resume, a 1,5 kilometer bypass was built around the station building.

Design
It is expected that the system will transport 60 million passengers a year on 35 trains, with a seating capacity of 417 per train.

Engineering
Saudi Railways Organisation commissioned Dar Al-handasah to prepare the concept design and tender documents of the Haramain High Speed Rail (HHSR) project. Dar Al-handasah was also assigned to the construction supervision and project management of the HHSR. Dar Al-handasah work on the HHSR incorporates one cut-and-cover tunnel, 46 rail bridges, 9 wadi bridges, and 5 rail underpasses, 53 vehicular overpasses, 30 vehicular underpasses, 12 camel crossings, 5 stations, and 3 depots to allow the rail to fulfil the needs of its users.

Trains
36 Spanish Talgo 350 SRO trains have been ordered, one of these is expected to  include a Dual (hybrid) coach pair for up to 20 or 30 VIPs; they will run at 300 km/h. The propulsion and bogies were made at Bombardier factories in Spain.

Stations
There are five stations on the line at: 
 Medina Station (King Abdulaziz Street-East)
 King Abdullah Economic City Station in Rabigh
 King Abdulaziz International Airport - opened 11 December 2019
 Jeddah Station (Naseem) - Operating
 Mecca Station (Rusaiyfah)

The Makkah Central Station is located near the 3rd Ring Road, in Rusaiyfah District near the Rusaiyfah park and ride to the Grand Mosque. The Jeddah Central Station is located on Haramain Road, in Al-Naseem District. The railway alignment route is on the median of the Haramain road. Medina has a passenger station. A station, connected via branch line, is built in the new King Abdulaziz International Airport.

According to Saudi Railways Organisation the stations are "aesthetically iconic" buildings with designs which take into account Islamic architectural traditions. They have shops, restaurants, mosques, car parking, a helipad and VIP lounges. Stations were designed by Buro Happold and Foster + Partners.

See also
 Saudi Arabia Railways
 Transport in Saudi Arabia
 Hejaz Railway

References

External links
Official Website
Saudi Railways Organization
 Haramain Saudi-Spanish Alliance 
 Haramain High Speed Rail Project video
 Makkah Central Station Project video

High-speed railway lines
Railway lines in Saudi Arabia
Buildings and structures in Saudi Arabia
High-speed rail in Saudi Arabia